Cembalo is the term for the harpsichord in German and some other European languages   (‘clavicembalo’ in Italian). It may also refer to: 
 Balaklava,
 Il cembalo, a nickname for the Palazzo Borghese, Rome